Patricia A. Sullivan (November 22, 1939 - August 20, 2009). Patricia Ann Sullivan served as Chancellor of UNC Greensboro from January 1, 1995 until July 2008. During her time as Chancellor, she was responsible for more than $500 million in construction and developments on campus, including the science building, the music building, a residence hall, a promenade, and a renovated student center. She increased enrollment, endowment funds, exchange programs, and number of PhD programs. In April 2008, she was honored with the Old North State Award for her service to North Carolina (given by Governor Mike Easley); that same year the Sullivan Science Building on UNCG’s campus was named in her honor. She died on August 20, 2009 from pancreatic cancer at the age of 69.

References

1939 births
2009 deaths
American academic administrators
University of North Carolina at Greensboro faculty
Women academic administrators
Deaths from pancreatic cancer
20th-century American academics